The diocese of Long Xuyên is a Roman Catholic diocese of Vietnam. The bishop is Joseph Trân Xuân Tiéu, since 2003.

The creation of the diocese in present form was declared November 24, 1960.

The diocese covers an area of 10,243 km², and is a suffragan diocese of the Archdiocese of Ho Chi Minh city.

By 2016, the diocese of Long Xuyên had about 247,000 believers (5.9% of the population), 275 priests and 186 parishes.

Queen of Peace Cathedral in Long Xuyên town has been assigned as the Cathedral of the diocese.

References

Long Xuyen
Christian organizations established in 1960
Roman Catholic dioceses and prelatures established in the 20th century
Long Xuyen, Roman Catholic Diocese of
1960 establishments in South Vietnam